Thomas Maier is an author, journalist, and television producer.  His book Masters of Sex: The Life and Times of William Masters and Virginia Johnson, the Couple Who Taught America How to Love is the basis for the Showtime drama Masters of Sex. 

He is the author of When Lions Roar: The Churchills and the Kennedys, a history of the two dynastic families. His other books include The Kennedys: America's Emerald Kings, a multi-generational history of the Kennedy family and the impact of their Irish-Catholic background on their lives, and Dr. Spock: An American Life, named a "Notable Book of the Year" in 1998 by The New York Times and the subject of a BBC and A&E biography documentary.

His 1994 book, Newhouse: All the Glitter, Power and Glory of America's Richest Media Empire and the Secretive Man Behind It, won the Frank Luther Mott Award by the National Honor Society in Journalism and Mass Communication for best media book of the year.

Maier joined Newsday in 1984 after working at the Chicago Sun-Times. He has won several awards in the field of journalism, including the national Society of Professional Journalists' top reporting prize on two occasions, the National Headliner Award, the Worth Bingham Prize, and the New York Deadline Club award. In 2002, he won the International Consortium of Investigative Journalists' top prize for a series about immigrant workplace deaths. He won the John M. Patterson Prize from the Columbia University Graduate School of Journalism for television documentary production and later received the John McCloy Journalism Fellowship to Europe. He lives on Long Island, New York.

Bibliography
 Newhouse: All the Glitter, Power and Glory of America's Richest Media Empire and the Secretive Man Behind It (1994)
 Dr. Spock: An American Life (1998)
 The Kennedys: America's Emerald Kings (2003)
 Masters of Sex: The Life and Times of William Masters and Virginia Johnson, the Couple Who Taught America How to Love (2009)
 When Lions Roar: The Churchills and the Kennedys (2014)
 Mafia Spies: The Inside Story of the CIA, Gangsters, JFK, and Castro (2019), Skyhorse Publishing,

Awards
 1986: National Sigma Delta Chi Award, Society of Professional Journalists, "The Confession-Takers" series.
 1994: Frank Luther Mott-Kappa Tau Alpha Research Award for Newhouse: All the Glitter, Power and Glory of America's Richest Media Empire and the Secretive Man Behind It.
 1998: New York Times Notable Book of The Year, Author Dr. Spock: An American Life.
 2002: ICIJ, now known as Daniel Pearl Awards for Outstanding International Investigative Reporting, Death on the Job: Immigrants at Risk.
 2010: National Headliners Award, Fallout: The Legacy of Brookhaven Lab in the Pacific.
 2012: Sigma Delta Chi Award, The Society of Professional Journalist, Online Investigative Reporting.
 2012: Society of American Business Editors and Writers Best in Business.
 2012: Investigative Reporters and Editors (IRE), Finalist with NPR.
 2012, Karpoor Chandra Kulish (KCK) International Award for Excellence in Print Journalism, Winner.
 2013, Critics Choice Television Award, "Most Exciting New Series,"Author/Producer Masters of Sex.
 2014, Golden Globes, Best Drama Nominee, Author/Producer Masters of Sex.
 2014, American Film Institute (AFI), TV Program of The Year, Author/Producer Masters of Sex.
 2014: New York Press Club, Television, The Body Business, News 12 Long Island/Newsday.
 2016, USC Scripter Award, Nominated, Author/Producer Masters of Sex.

References

External links
 
 

American male journalists
People from Long Island
Living people
Fordham University alumni
Columbia University Graduate School of Journalism alumni
Year of birth missing (living people)